Per Fredrik Bremberg (born Per Fredrik Lindquist on 21 June 1973) is a Swedish former professional ice hockey player. He was drafted in the third round, 55th overall, by the New Jersey Devils in the 1991 NHL Entry Draft. He played eight games in the National Hockey League with the Edmonton Oilers in the 1998–99 season.

Bremberg is the all-time leader in regular season points scored in Elitserien. He took the record from Jörgen Jönsson on 29 January 2009 — just ten days after Jönsson set it himself.

Career statistics

Regular season and playoffs

International

References

Bremberg announces retirement (Swedish)

External links

1973 births
Living people
Djurgårdens IF Hockey players
Edmonton Oilers players
Hamilton Bulldogs (AHL) players
HC Davos players
Huddinge IK players
HV71 players
Jokerit players
Malmö Redhawks players
Nacka HK players
New Jersey Devils draft picks
People from Södertälje
Swedish expatriate ice hockey players in Canada
Swedish expatriate ice hockey players in Finland
Swedish expatriate sportspeople in Switzerland
Swedish ice hockey right wingers
Timrå IK players
Sportspeople from Stockholm County